Richard Costain (1839–1902) was the founder of Costain Group, one of the United Kingdom's largest, oldest and best-known construction businesses.

Career
Born and raised in the Isle of Man, Richard Costain moved to Crosby, Merseyside where, in 1865, he founded a small but well-equipped construction business. In the early days of the business, he worked in partnership with his brother-in-law William Kneen and together they expanded the business until it was operating both in Lancashire and on the Isle of Man. Kneen and Costain purchased tracts of land, then built many houses on them. Masons and joiners were recruited from Arbory on the Isle of Man.

Richard Costain later lived at Blundellsands, located near Crosby.

He died in West Derby in 1902 leaving the business, by then known as Richard Costain Limited, to his son William Percy Costain.

Family
In 1866, Costain married Margaret Kneen.

References

1839 births
1902 deaths
19th-century English businesspeople
People from Crosby, Merseyside
20th-century English businesspeople
British construction businesspeople